"Hate (I Really Don't Like You)" is a single by the Plain White T's. It is the first single from their fourth studio album Every Second Counts, released in 2006. This song has an acoustic version available on the Best Buy version of Every Second Counts. The song had become one of the band's highest charting singles.

Music video 
The video has been seen on MTV, Kerrang!, MTV2 and Fuse TV. The music video shows lead singer Tom Higgenson taking a stroll in the city while many scenes of chaos are happening. It also has shots of the band performing in what seems to be a warehouse. His ex-girlfriend, played by Italia Ricci, comes along, and in surprise continues to watch him perform. It was filmed in Toronto, Ontario, Canada.

Track listing
Promo CD Single 
 "Hate (I Really Don't Like You)" (Album version) — 3:45
 "Hate (I Really Don't Like You)" (Instrumental) — 3:45
 "Hate (I Really Don't Like You)" (Acoustic demo) — 3:28

Digital Download
 "Hate (I Really Don't Like You)" (Album version) — 3:45

In popular culture
It has been released in Australia through The Hot Hits.
Featured in the Saints Row 2 soundtrack.

Weekly charts

References

2006 singles
Plain White T's songs
Hollywood Records singles
Rock ballads
Song recordings produced by Johnny K
2006 songs